The 1947 Oregon Webfoots football team was an American football team that represented the University of Oregon in the Pacific Coast Conference (PCC) during the 1947 college football season.  In its third season under head coach Jim Aiken, the team compiled a 7–3 record (5–1 in PCC, tie for second), and outscored their opponents 174 to 121. Oregon played its home games on campus at Hayward Field in Eugene.

Quarterback Norm Van Brocklin led the PCC with 76 completions for 939 passing yards and an average of 40.1 yards per punt. Halfback Jake Leicht led the conference with 630 rushing yards on 119 carries. Dan Garza led the team in scoring with 30 points.

Three Oregon players were honored on the All-Coast teams selected by the PCC coaches, the United Press (UP) and Associated Press (AP): Van Brocklin at quarterback (AP-1, UP-1, Coaches-1); Leicht at halfback (Coaches-1, UP-1); and Brad Ecklund (Coaches-1).

Schedule

References

External links
 Game program: Oregon at Washington State – November 8, 1947

Oregon
Oregon Ducks football seasons
Oregon Webfoots football